Stéphane Andriolo (born 6 November 1971) is a French former professional tennis player.

Active on tour in the 1990s, Andriolo reached a best singles world ranking of 341. In 1994 he made his only career ATP Tour main draw appearance at the Indonesian Open in Jakarta and featured in the Australian Open qualifiers.

References

External links
 
 

1971 births
Living people
French male tennis players